Radio Jazz FM is a jazz radio station in Bulgaria that started in 2001. It is part of BTV Media Group, which is owned by Central European Media Enterprises. From 2001 to 2006 it aired in Plovdiv, Varna, Burgas, Blagoevgrad, Ruse, Stara Zagora, and Sofia. From its first years it aired special projects with Radio Net and Sport Radio. Starting in 2005 the radio aired the Doiche Vele news. In 2006 the radio was replaced in all cities, except Sofia, by N-JOY.

References 

Radio stations in Bulgaria
Jazz radio stations
2001 establishments in Bulgaria
Radio stations established in 2001
Bulgarian jazz